Zamoskvorechye District is a district of Central Administrative Okrug of the federal city of Moscow, Russia. Population:  

The district contains the eastern half of historical Zamoskvorechye area (its western half is administered by Yakimanka District), and the territories of Zatsepa Street and Paveletsky Rail Terminal south of the Garden Ring. The boundary between Yakimanka and Zamoskvorechye districts follows Balchug Street and  Bolshaya Ordynka Street (north of Garden Ring), Korovy Val and Mytnaya streets (south of Garden Ring).

History

Old Muscovy

Territories on the right (southern) bank of Moskva River, now known as Zamoskvorechye, were first colonized in the 14th century. Two river crossings, west and east of the Moscow Kremlin's walls, provide access to roads which originally continued south to Kaluga and Serpukhov, and served as main axes of settlement. Bolshaya Ordynka Street (Serpukhov road), currently the western boundary of the district, is named after Orda, Golden Horde, and was initially home to the Tatar community. Regular floods and the north-south migration of Moskva river bed limited construction to a narrow, 500-700 meter wide strip of land between Ordynka and Tatarskaya streets. The development of Zamoskvorechye followed the eastward expansion of the city on the northern bank, thus eastern Zamoskvorechye is younger than the western Yakimanka District. For example, present-day Pyatnitskaya Street emerged early in the 15th century, when the expansion of Moscow Kremlin moved the wooden Bolshoy Moskvoretsky Bridge one block eastward.<ref>This section is based on P.V.Sytin's History of Moscow Streets'''', П.В.Сытин, Из истории московских улиц, М, 1948 </ref>

The fortified line on the site of the present-day Garden Ring was built in 1591-1592 during the reign of Feodor I. Within the fortress wall, life was organized in a patchwork sloboda system. Soldiers, craftsmen and foreigners settled in clearly defined communities, with some degree of personal liberty and independence from the tsar's authorities:
Royal garden attendants (садовники, sadovniki) settled around Balchug Street, in the beginning of present-day Sadovnicheskaya Street from 1495 until the fire of 1701
Tanners specializing in sheepskin (ovchinniki) settled the beginning of Pyatnitskaya Street, and gave their name to Ovchinnikovsky Lanes
Royal mint workers (monetchiki) settled in the southern end of the neighborhood on Pyatnitskaya Street (Monetchikovsky Lanes)
Streltsy troops under command of colonel Veshniakov gave name to Vishnyakovsky Lane
Tatar community, still identifiable in Tatarskaya Streets populationwww.etnosfera.ru "Татарский культурно-просветительский центр в Москве" , Этносфера, май 2003 
Court translators (tolmachi, German: Dolmetscher) in Tolmachevsky Lanes

18th century

Sloboda system fell apart as a result of Petrine reforms. The century was preceded by mass executions of Streltsy (September 30, 1698); all Streltsy troops were disbanded by 1720. Craftsmen lost their businesses when the royal court relocated to Saint Petersburg in 1713; the territories were slowly re-settled by farmers and merchants. Wealthier class concentrated in Pyatnitskaya and Ordynka streets; Zamoskvorechye became a quiet, country-like land of single-story houses and conservative businessmen. They gradually improved the area with new churches like the 1755 Church of the Savior on Bolvany. Administratively, Zamoskvorechye and Yakimanka were separated in 1782, when Catherine II divided territory of Moscow into 20 police districts.

In 1783, Moscow was hit by a disastrous flood. As a consequence, the city cleared the old river bed, building a canal that separated Sadovniki from the mainland (see Vodootvodny Canal for details and maps of the 1780s canal). Large areas east of Tatarskaya streets were flooded with an intention of building a river harbour and a fortified grain port on the eastern tip of the new island. These plans did not materialize; flooded lands were reclaimed in the 1820s, and were used as pastures and gardens. Sadovniki fort was built on a different site, closer to city center, as the New Kriegskomissariat (1778–1780), a neoclassical castle housing military offices and depots. Since that time, military has continuous presence in Sadovniki East.

19th century

Construction of Babiegorodskaya Dam and clearing of Vodootvodny Canal in the 1830s reduced the flood hazard, but the land remained cheap. This led to steady industrialization of Zamoskvorechye,  starting with small home-based factories continuing the old sloboda traditions. Soon after Emancipation reform of 1861, vacant lots in Sadovniki and Tatarskaya Streets became an industrialized, working-class area. These factories, from textile to turbine blades, were recently torn down or rebuilt into office space (Sparkling Wine Bottlery, in Sadovnicheskaya Street, still operates). Construction of Pererva and Kolomna dams in 1874-1877 attempted to improve shipping, however, at this time river shipping already lost competition to railroads and never picked up.

In 1857, English brothers Theodore and Edward Bromley set up a mechanical plant south from the Garden Ring, producing small hand tools. Bromley business rapidly expanded, and by 1917 controlled numerous metallurgical and mechanical plants around Paveletsky railroad, having a monopoly in plumbing supplies and railroad tooling. Another well-known business still has its headquarters on the corner of Pyatnitskaya and canal: Smirnoff distillery, established on this site in 1862.

Moscow's first electrical powerplant was built in 1886 in Tverskoy District; the oldest extant powerplant, MOGES-1 (1896) still operates in Sadovniki. Railroad came to Zamoskvorechye in 1900 with the completion of Paveletsky Rail Terminal (then Ryazan-Ural Railroad Terminal or Saratov terminal), causing rapid industrial construction south of Garden Ring. The builders planned to extend this mainline railroad north by the canal, terminating in Boloto square across Kremlin; this did not materialize.

Modern history

In 1922, Bolshevik administration closed and looted 22 churches in Zamoskvorechye and Yakimanka; more destruction followed, leaving only one operational church in each district. 17 religious buildings survived to date, including a church of Novozybkov Bespopovtsy (an Old Believers denomination) and the Historical Mosque (est. 1823, www.tatarmoscow.ru). Housing construction in the 1920s proceeded slowly, with some examples surviving (a big constructivist block by Bolshoy Ustinsky Bridge was razed in the 1990s, citing imminent hazards, the lot is still vacant).

1935 Master Plan of Moscow called for completing Boulevard Ring through Zamoskvorechye, which was not done. However, a thin line of stalinist buildings, starting from Komissariatsky Bridge, indicates the path of this failed project. More Stalinist buildings were built on the perimeter of Zamoskvorechye (Garden Ring and embankments). Flood hazard was eradicated with the construction of 1932-1938 Moscow Canal. River banks that used to change every season were firmly set in granite; downtown bridges were rebuilt to 6-8 lane capacity.

In 1941, residents of Zamoskvorechye formed the Twelfth Militia Division of Kirovsky District. Later renamed the 139th Rifle Division, this unit fought at Yelnya Offensive and at Mozhaisk Defense Line. Few survived.

Zamoskvorechye was dramatically altered in the 1960s-1970s by inserting standardized concrete buildings in the middle of historical century area, especially in Novokuznetskaya Street. One of these plattenbau projects starred as the site of 1973 film Ivan Vasilievich: Back to the Future. Destruction continues in the 1990s-2000s, with façadist insertion of highrise office blocks behind "restored" two-story façades. Meanwhile, permanent population decreases as the city condemns historical buildings for office redevelopment and evicts residents. An example is the large 1900s block at Sadovnicheskaya, 80, evicted in 2003, which is now part of a modern business park. 

Recent publications in the Moscow Development plan for the District has called for a restoration and modernisation of many of the older buildings which is gradually happening from the Garden Ring toward the Kremlin.

Notable buildings, cultural and educational facilities

Museums
Bakhrushin Museum of theater (built in 1896), corner of Bakhrushina Street and Garden Ring)
Vladimir Lenin memorial train at Paveletsky Rail Terminal
Tretyakov Gallery and all its affiliate halls are actually located in Yakimanka District, two blocks west from the boundary between two districts

Churches

Church of Beheading of John the Baptist (18th century), Pyatnitskaya, 4 
Church of St. George in Yendova (1653), Sadovnicheskaya Street, 6 
Church of Resurrection behind Serpukhov Gates (1762), Bolshaya Serpukhovskaya, 24 
Church of Iberian Theotokos in Vspolye (1791–1802), Bolshaya Ordynka, 39 
Church of Icon of Theotokos the Mother of the Dead, Zatsepa, 41
Church of Icon of Theotokos the Mother of Joy in Sorrow, Bolshaya Serpukhovskaya, 31-4
Church of Intercession of Theotokos, Novokuznetskayam 38-1, of Old Believers Russian Old-Orthodox Church
Church of life-giving Trinity in Vishnyaki (1824–1826, architect: Afanasy Grigoriev), Pyatnitskaya, 51 
Church of Archangel Michael in Ovchinniki, Sredny Ovchinnikovsky, 7 
Church of Saint Clement, Pope of Rome, Pyatnitskaya, 26/7
Church of Saints Mikhail and Fyodor, Martyrs of Chernigov (1675), Chernigovsky, 3. Named for two martyrs slain when they would not renounce their Christian faith
Church of Saint Martyrs Frol and Lavr in Zatsepa (1778), Dubininskaya, 9/3 
Church of Saint Nicholas in Zayaitskoye (1741–1759, attributed to architect Ivan Michurin, Second Raushsky, 1-3 
Church of Saint Nicholas in Kuznetskaya and Church of Saint Vladimir, Vishnyakovsky, 15 
Church of Saint Nicholas in Pyzhi, Bolshaya Ordynka, 27 
Church of Transfiguration of Savior in Bolvanovka (1755, disputed), Second Novokuznetsky, 10

Theaters
Moscow International House of Music in Red Hills
Maly Theater, second stage (built in 1915 as Struisky Theater), Bolshaya Ordynka, 69Teatr Luny'', Malaya Ordynka, 31

Listed memorial buildings
18th - early 19th century buildings in Pyatnitskaya Street (Nn. 18, 19, 31, 44, 46, 67 etc.)
18th - early 19th century buildings in Bolshaya Ordynka Street (Nn. 21, 41, 45 etc.)
19th century housing and military institutions in Sadovnicheskaya Street (Nn. 57, 59 etc.)
19th century buildings in Novokuznetskaya Street (Nn. 28, 29, 31 etc.)
New Kriegskomissariat, Kosmodamianskaya, 24-26 and adjacent historical buildings (Nn. 28)
School 518 (1935), the only listed postconstructivism memorial building

Public transportation access
Moscow Metro:
Novokuznetskaya, Tretyakovskaya - north and center
Dobryninskaya, Serpukhovskaya - south-west
Paveletskaya-Radialnaya, Paveletskaya-Koltsevaya - south-east
Tulskaya - southern extremity

References

External links

www.zmsk.ru Official website of Zamoskvorechye District
Russian State Library 1882 photographs, temples of Zamoskvorechye and Yakimanka
Zamoskvorechye is a vast and exceptionally interesting district south of the Kremlin [In English]

 
Tourist attractions in Moscow
Central Administrative Okrug
Tatar culture